"Crying Over You" is a song by Canadian new wave group Platinum Blonde, released as the first single from their 1985 album Alien Shores.  The single reached No. 1 on the Canadian record charts on Sept. 7, 1985. The song features a guitar solo by Alex Lifeson from Rush. A shorter edit of the 12" 'Radical Mix' version of the song appears as the 'B' side of their single 'Somebody Somewhere'.

Track listing
7" single:
A: "Crying Over You" - 3:35
B: "It Ain't Love Anyway" - 3:08

12" single:
A: "Crying Over You (Radical Mix)" - 6:04
B1: "Crying Over You (Dub Version)" - 4:45
B2: "Crying Over You (Instrabeat Mix)" - 4:30

Remixes and additional production by Shep Pettibone.

Charts

References

1985 singles
CBS Records singles
1985 songs
Platinum Blonde (band) songs
RPM Top Singles number-one singles